The Missouri Valley Conference baseball tournament is the conference baseball championship of the NCAA Division I Missouri Valley Conference.  All eight teams participate in the double-elimination tournament, which in 2014 was played at Bob Warn Field at Sycamore Stadium in Terre Haute, IN. The 2022 Missouri Valley Conference Baseball tournament will be held in Springfield, Missouri at Hammons Field. The winner of the tournament receives an automatic berth to the NCAA Division I Baseball Championship.

Champions

By year
The following is a list of conference champions and sites listed by year.

*Indicates declared champion, tournament final canceled due to inclement weather.

By school
The following is a list of tournament championships listed by school.

Italics indicate that the program no longer fields a baseball team in the Missouri Valley Conference.

References